"Love Don't Care (Whose Heart It Breaks)" is a song co-written and recorded by American country music artist Earl Thomas Conley.  It was released in April 1985 as the third and final single from the album Treadin' Water.  The song was Conley's ninth number one country hit as a solo artist.  The single went to number one for one week and spent a total of thirteen weeks on the country chart.  The song was written by Conley and Randy Scruggs.

Music video
A music video for the song was released and has been seen on GAC.

Charts

Weekly charts

Year-end charts

References

1985 singles
1984 songs
Earl Thomas Conley songs
Songs written by Randy Scruggs
Songs written by Earl Thomas Conley
RCA Records singles